Professor August Musger (February 10, 1868 – October 30, 1929) was an Austrian priest and physicist who is best remembered for his invention of slow motion.

Invention
Musger invented the slow motion technique using a mirrored drum as a synchronizing mechanism.  The device he used was patented in 1904 and was first presented in Graz, Styria in 1907 using a projector made by K. Löffler, owner of a cinema.

Notes and references

Austrian inventors
Austrian physicists
Cinema pioneers
1868 births
1929 deaths